The Filmfare Best South Art Director Award is given by the Filmfare magazine as part of its annual Filmfare Awards for South Indian films.

The award was first given in 1997. Here is a list of the award winners and the films for which they won.

Winners

References

Filmfare Awards South